Apothosia is a genus of moths in the subfamily Arctiinae. It was described by George Hampson in 1918 and contains the species Apothosia conformis, which is found in Malawi.

References

Endemic fauna of Malawi
Lithosiini
Monotypic moth genera
Lepidoptera of Malawi
Moths of Sub-Saharan Africa